Léonard Emiel Steyaert (born 11 March 1910, date of death unknown) was a Belgian boxer who competed in the 1928 Summer Olympics and won the bronze medal in the middleweight class.

1928 Olympic results
Below is the record of Léonard Steyaert, a Belgian middleweight boxer who competed at the 1928 Amsterdam Olympics:

 Round of 32: bye
 Round of 16: defeated Albert Leidmann (Germany) on points
 Quarterfinal: defeated John Chase (Ireland) on points
 Semifinal: lost to Piero Toscani (Italy) on points
 Bronze Medal Bout: defeated Fred Mallin (Great Britain) on points (was awarded bronze medal)

Pro career
Steyaert turned pro in 1929 and had limited success.  He fought all of his bouts in Europe and retired in 1938.  He returned for one bout in 1945 before retiring for good with a professional record of 5-12-8 with 1 knockout.

References

External links

Léonard Steyaert's profile at databaseOlympics.com
Léonard Steyaert's profile at Sports Reference.com

Year of death missing
Middleweight boxers
Olympic boxers of Belgium
Boxers at the 1928 Summer Olympics
Olympic bronze medalists for Belgium
1910 births
Olympic medalists in boxing
Belgian male boxers
Medalists at the 1928 Summer Olympics